IE Business School is a graduate and undergraduate school of business, located in Madrid, Spain, European Union, Europe. It was founded in 1973 under the name Instituto de Empresa and since 2009 is part of IE University. IE Business School runs BBA, MBA, Executive MBA, master's degree programs in finance and management, executive education programs, PhD, and DBA programs.

History 
In 1973, three entrepreneurs founded IE Business School with the goal of fostering an entrepreneurial environment. This is achieved through its various programs and many collaborations, such as the IE Brown Executive MBA, a dual MBA with Brown University, and an Asian-focused program run with Singapore Management University.

Campus 

IE Business School is centrally situated in Barrio de Salamanca, Madrid's financial district.

In addition to the existing IE Business school campus, IE University has a new campus, known as "Campus IE", located in the north of Madrid.

International rankings

Notable faculty 
 Eduard Punset Casals – Innovation and technology professor, lawyer and economist
 Martín Varsavsky – Argentine entrepreneur, author and professor
 Juan José Güemes – Former Politician, General Secretary of Tourism 2000–2003, Madrid Councilor for Employment 2003–2007, Madrid Health Councilor 2007–2010
Luis Garicano – Spanish Economist, Vice-President of the Alliance of Liberals and Democrats for Europe, Head of Economic and Employment Policy at Citizens

Notable alumni

References

External links 

 IE Business School Main Website

Business schools in Spain
Educational institutions established in 1973
1973 establishments in Spain
IE University